The William Lawrence Saunders Gold Medal was first awarded in 1927 and recognizes "distinguished achievement in mining other than coal". The award is funded by the American Institute of Mining, Metallurgical, and Petroleum Engineers and named for William Lawrence Saunders.

Winners
2022 - Joseph Dick
2019 - Timothy D. Arnold
2018 - John D. Wiebmer
2017 - Phillips S. Baker, Jr.
2016 - Ronald L. Parratt
2015 - William M. Zisch
2014 - Timothy J. Haddon
2013 - Ronald Thiessen
2012 - Ron Guill
2011 - Harry F. Cougher
2010 - Douglas B. Silver
2009 - Patrick J. Ryan (engineer)
2008 - Stanley Dempsey
2006 - James L. Madson
2005 - F. Steven Mooney
2004 - Paul C. Jones (engineer)
2003 - Thomas J. O'Neil
2002 - Robert W. Schafer
2001 - Richard T. Moolick
2000 - Robert N. Hickman
1998 - Donald Vester Fites (born 1934) 
1997 - Hugo T. Dummett
1996 - Leonard Harris (engineer)
1995 - J. Burgess Winter
1994 - T. Peter Philip
1993 - Kenneth J. Barr
1992 - Philip C. Walsh
1991 - G. Frank Joklik
1990 - Milton H. Ward
1989 - Richard J. Stoehr
1988 - Roy Woodall
1987 - Charles L. Pillar
1986 - Richard L. Brittain
1984 - John C. Kinnear, Jr.
1983 - Sir Frank Espie
1982 - John Towers (engineer)
1980 - James S. Westwater
1979 - Henry Thomas Mudd (1913-1990) 
1978 - Russell H. Bennett
1977 - Frank Coolbaugh
1975 - Charles Dixon Clarke
1974 - H. Myles Jacob
1972 - Stanley M. Jarrett
1970 - Elmer A. Jones
1968 - Charles M. Brinckerhoff
1967 - Ralph Douglas Parker
1966 - Wesley P. Goss
1965 - Francis Cameron (engineer)
1964 - Walter C. Lawson (engineer)
1963 - Edward Ignatius Renouard
1962 - Joseph Hugh Reid
1961 - Marcus David Banghart
1960 - Robert J. Linney
1959 - John Ballantine Knaebel
1958 - William Jesse Coulter
1956 - Louis Buchman
1954 - Simeon Stansifer Clarke
1951 - Clyde Evarts Weed
1950 - Howard Nicholas Eavenson
1949 - Stanly Alexander Easton
1947 - LeRoy Salsich
1946 - Fred Searls, Jr.
1944 - George Bates Harrington
1941 - Herman C. Bellinger
1939 - Louis S. Cates (18811959)
1937 - Erskine Ramsay (1864-1953)
1936 - Clinton H. Crane
1935 - James MacNaughton (engineer)
1934 - Pope Yeatman
1933 - Walter Hull Aldridge
1932 - Frederick Worthen Bradley
1930 - Daniel Cowan Jackling (1869–1956)
1929 - John Hays Hammond (1855–1936)
1928 - Herbert Hoover (1874–1964) 
1927 - David William Brunton

See also

 List of engineering awards

Footnotes

Awards of the American Institute of Mining, Metallurgical, and Petroleum Engineers